Live! is a 1993 live album by The Isley Brothers on Elektra Records. Their final Warner album, the Isleys sung all of their classic hits including "It's Your Thing", "That Lady", "Between the Sheets", "Voyage to Atlantis", "Shout", "Take Me to the Next Phase", "Fight the Power" and "For the Love of You".

Critical reception

Track listing
"Here We Go Again"
"Between the Sheets"
"Smooth Sailin' Tonight"
"Voyage to Atlantis"
"Take Me to the Next Phase"
"Medley - Choosey Lover/Footsteps in the Dark/Groove With You/Hello It's Me/Don't Say Goodnight (It's Time for Love)/Spend the Night (Ce Soir)"
"That Lady"
"It's Your Thing"
"Shout"
"For the Love of You"
"Fight the Power"
"Make Me Say It Again"

Personnel
Ronald Isley - lead vocals, backing vocals, executive producer
Ernie Isley - lead guitar
Tony Maiden - electric guitar
Marvin Isley, Sekou Bunch -  bass guitar
Rodney Franklin - keyboards
Roman Johnson - keyboards, synthesizer
Herman Matthews - drums
Marina Bambino - percussion

References

The Isley Brothers albums
Albums produced by Angela Winbush
Albums produced by Ronald Isley
1993 live albums
Elektra Records live albums